This is a comprehensive listing of official releases by the hip hop group Cypress Hill.

Albums

Studio albums

Compilation albums

Live albums

EPs

Collaborative EPs

Singles

As featured artist

Collaborative singles

Guest appearances

Notes

 A   "How I Could Just Kill a Man" and "The Phunky Feel One" were released together as a double A-side single in the United States.
 B  "Hand on the Pump" did not enter the Hot R&B/Hip-Hop Songs chart, but peaked at number 6 on the Bubbling Under R&B/Hip-Hop Singles chart, which acts as a 25-song extension to the R&B/Hip-Hop Songs chart.
 C  "Latin Lingo" did not enter the Hot R&B/Hip-Hop Songs chart, but peaked at number 5 on the Bubbling Under R&B/Hip-Hop Singles chart, which acts as a 25-song extension to the R&B/Hip-Hop Songs chart.
 D  "Illusions" did not enter the Billboard Hot 100, but peaked at number 3 on the Bubbling Under Hot 100 Singles chart, which acts as a 25-song extension to the Hot 100.
 E   "(Rap) Superstar" and "(Rock) Superstar" were released together as a double A-side single in the United Kingdom.
 F   "Highlife" and "Can't Get the Best of Me" were released together as a double A-side single in the United Kingdom.
 G  "Lowrider" did not enter the Hot R&B/Hip-Hop Songs chart, but peaked at number 8 on the Bubbling Under R&B/Hip-Hop Singles chart, which acts as a 25-song extension to the R&B/Hip-Hop Songs chart.
 H   "Lowrider" and "Trouble" were released together as a double A-side single in several European territories.
 I  "What's Your Number" did not enter the Hot R&B/Hip-Hop Songs chart, but peaked at number 6 on the Bubbling Under R&B/Hip-Hop Singles chart, which acts as a 25-song extension to the R&B/Hip-Hop Songs chart.
 J  "Armada Latina" did not enter the Billboard Hot 100, but peaked at number 6 on the Bubbling Under Hot 100 Singles chart, which acts as a 25-song extension to the Hot 100.

References

Discography
Rap rock discographies
Discographies of American artists